The Mulligan Highway is a state highway in Queensland, Australia. It runs for approximately 266 km between Mareeba and Cooktown, on the east coast of Cape York Peninsula where it terminates.

Named after bushman James Venture Mulligan the sealed highway follows the old Cooktown Developmental Road and was completed in 2006.  Since it was sealed, travelling time from Cairns to Cooktown has reduced from 6 to 3½ hours.

List of towns along the highway
 Mount Molloy
 Lakeland

Major intersections

See also

 Highways in Australia
 Kalkajaka National Park
 List of highways in Queensland

References

Highways in Queensland